Planet Jarre: 50 Years of Music is a compilation album by French electronic musician and composer Jean-Michel Jarre, released on 14 September 2018 to commemorate Jarre's 50 years in the music business.

A total of forty-one tracks were chosen by Jarre himself for inclusion, among them two new songs ("Herbalizer" and "Coachella Opening"). Jarre remastered, and in some cases "retouched", the tracks himself. During the process, he decided that he had pursued four quite different styles of composition and therefore divided the project into four "universes" - "Soundscapes", "Themes", "Sequences" and "Explorations and Early Works". Some tracks were released in 5.1 surround sound.

Contents and release

Jarre's new-mix "retouched" versions for the album comprised Chronologie Parts 1 and 4, Oxygène Parts 2, 8 and 20, Équinoxe Parts 4 and 7, "Bells" and "Fourth Rendez-Vous"; as well as edits of the 2004 AERO version of "Last Rendez-vous" and the intro section of "Ethnicolor", a three-minute "Waiting for Cousteau" excerpt, and the title track from 1988’s Revolutions. (The latter was actually "Revolution, Revolutions", the title track from the 1991 Revolutions reissue, which had removed Kudsi Erguner’s sampled ney flute part and substituted an Arabian singer and orchestra.)

Two fuller 2018 remixes were also presented. 1984’s "Zoolookologie" appeared in a new trance-inspired version, and there was a reworking of the 1982 live version of "Magnetic Fields Part 2" from Les Concerts en Chine (with crowd noise removed and new synth overdubs added).

The "Explorations and Early Works" section of the album contained two previously unavailable rare or unreleased tracks. One was "Aor Bleu" (part of a suite of compositions Jarre had developed while studying musique concrete with Pierre Schaeffer at Groupe de Recherches Musicales in the 1960s, and which he’d previously revisited as part of a masterclass in Bourges during 2002).  The other was one of the pieces from the super-rare Musique pour Supermarché album,  1982’s single-copy art/collectable-commerce experiment. Although the latter track was billed as a demo, it was later identified as "Part 1" from the album.

All of the other rare tracks had been released seven years earlier on the Essentials & Rarities compilation. These comprised three more GRM-era pieces ("Happiness is a Sad Song" - originally produced for "Les Fêtes de la Jeunesse" in Reims in 1968 - and both sides of Jarre’s 1971 debut single "La Cage/Erosmachine"), two tracks from 1973’s Les Granges Brulees, and "Hypnose" (actually "Hypnose (Partie 2) Instrumental", the Jarre-written-and-performed b-side of a 1973 Dominique Webb synthpop single).

The compilation's release was accompanied by the announcement of Équinoxe Infinity, a 40th anniversary sequel to his 1978 album Équinoxe, due for release on 16 November 2018.

Track listing

5.1 Tracks
Circus
Équinoxe 2
Équinoxe 5
Exit
Oxygène 15
Oxygène 17
Oxygène 2
Stardust
Switched on Leon
Opening
Souvenir of China
Zoolookologie

Formats
 Standard jewel-cased double CD
 Digipack double CD ("Deluxe version")
 Box set – Cabinet "Super Deluxe Fan Box", 2 CD, 2 cassettes, MP3 download option with 5.1 surround sound – limited to 4000 numbered copies
 Vinyl – 4 LP 180g, MP3 download option – limited to 3500 copies

Charts

References

External links 
 https://jeanmicheljarre.com/

2018 greatest hits albums
Jean-Michel Jarre albums
Sony Music albums